Hersekzade or Hersekli Ahmed Pasha ("Ahmed Pasha, son of the Herzog"; Serbo-Croatian: Ahmed-paša Hercegović; Aхмед-паша Херцеговић; 1459 – 21 July 1517), born as Stjepan Hercegović, he was the youngest son of the Herceg Stjepan Vukčić. In his adolescence he was taken to Constantinople, where he adopted Islam along with the peculiar way of life of the Ottoman court, which made possible his advancement through the Ottoman government and military ranks, eventually occupying highest offices of the Empire's government and military as a statesman and navy's grand admiral.

Early life
Stjepan was born into the Kosača family in  1459. He was third and youngest son of Herceg Stjepan Vukčić, at the time most powerful Bosnian noblemen. Stjepan's half-siblings from his father's first marriage included Queen Katarina, wife of King Stjepan Tomaš, Vladislav Hercegović, and Vlatko Hercegović, their father's successor. Stjepan's family belonged to the Bosnian Church, but were "shaky Christians" like most of their countrymen. His half-sister, Catherine, converted to Roman Catholicism upon marriage and became pious follower of the church, while Stjepan himself adopted Islam and changed his name to Ahmed after moving to Constantinople in about 1473.

Career
Hersekli Ahmed Pasha was a five-time Grand Vizier of the Ottoman Empire and Grand Admiral to the sultan, serving five times as Grand Vizier in the period from 1497 to 1515. He died on 21 July 1517 of natural causes, toward the end of the reign of Selim I.

Family
He married Hundi Sultan, a daughter of Sultan Bayezid II by his wife Bülbül Hatun, in 1484. 
They had at least two sons and two daughters:
 Sultanzade Musa Bey
 Sultanzade Mustafa Bey
 Kamerşah Hanımsultan
 Hümaşah Hanımsultan

See also
List of grand dukes of Bosnia

References

Bibliography
 

Grand Viziers of Selim I
Kapudan Pashas
Civil servants from the Ottoman Empire
Military personnel of the Ottoman Empire
1459 births
1517 deaths
15th-century Grand Viziers of the Ottoman Empire
16th-century Grand Viziers of the Ottoman Empire
1490s in the Ottoman Empire
1500s in the Ottoman Empire
1510s in the Ottoman Empire
Kosača noble family
Pashas
Damats
Slavs from the Ottoman Empire
Bosnian Muslims from the Ottoman Empire
Bosnia and Herzegovina former Christians
Converts to Islam from Christianity
Ottoman Bosnian nobility
Hercegović noble family